In geometry, Hessenberg varieties, first studied by Filippo De Mari, Claudio Procesi, and Mark A. Shayman, are a family of subvarieties of the full flag variety which are defined by a Hessenberg function h and a linear transformation X.  The study of Hessenberg varieties was first motivated by questions in numerical analysis in relation to algorithms for computing eigenvalues and eigenspaces of the linear operator X.  Later work by T. A. Springer, Dale Peterson, Bertram Kostant, among others, found connections with combinatorics, representation theory and cohomology.

Definitions 
A Hessenberg function is a map 

 

such that 

for each i. For example, the function that sends the numbers 1 to 5 (in order) to 2, 3, 3, 4, and 5 is a Hessenberg function.

For any Hessenberg function h and a linear transformation 

the Hessenberg variety  is the set of all flags  such that 

 

for all i.

Examples 
Some examples of Hessenberg varieties (with their  function) include:

The Full Flag variety: h(i) = n for all i

The Peterson variety:  for 

The Springer variety:  for all .

References
 

Bertram Kostant, Flag manifold quantum cohomology, the Toda lattice, and the representation with highest weight , Selecta Mathematica (N.S.) 2, 1996, 43–91.
Julianna Tymoczko, Linear conditions imposed on flag varieties, American Journal of Mathematics 128 (2006), 1587–1604.

Algebraic geometry
Algebraic combinatorics